"Son of a Gun" is the debut single of British dance music DJ Jake Williams, released under the name JX. It was released in March 1994, reaching number six in the United Kingdom and Australia and number 35 in the Netherlands. The song contains samples from the 1976 song "Touch and Go" by Ecstasy, Passion & Pain featuring Barbara Roy.

Critical reception
In his weekly UK chart commentary in Dotmusic, James Masterton described the song as a "bubbling synthesised dance hit". A reviewer from Music Week gave it four out of five, adding, "A corking house tune that has failed to keep its head down, hence the reissue. Lyrics with attitude and some stomping remixes from JX and Red Jerry among others." The RM Dance Update complimented it as a "banging Euro stomper". An editor, Andy Beevers, called it "an unstoppable belter with dead catchy hi-energy synth riffs and the unforgettable 'A man that's on the run is a dirty son of a gun' female vocal hook. There are apparently Alex Party remixes on the way, although this existing mix should be all you need to create dancefloor mayhem." He also declared it as "a potential hit". Another editor, James Hamilton, described it as a "diva prodded raver".

Chart performance
In the UK, the single originally peaked at number 13 on the UK Singles Chart on 2 April 1994. In August 1995, it was re-released after "You Belong to Me"'s chart success and peaked at number six the same month. On the UK Dance Singles Chart and Music Weeks Dance Singles chart, it reached number two and number one, respectively. In Scotland, it went to number four, while in Ireland, it entered the top 20. "Son of a Gun" was also a top-10 hit in Australia, peaking at number six.

Music video
Two different music videos were made for the song.

Track listings
 12-inch, UK and Europe
A1: "Son of a Gun" (Red Jerry/JX Mix)
A2: "Son of a Gun" (C.Y.B. Run Mix) 
B1: "Son of a Gun" (Alex Party Mix) 
B2: "Son of a Gun" (A Deeper Cut) 

 CD single, UK
"Son of a Gun" (Hooj Edit) – 3:38
"Son of a Gun" (Red Jerry/JX Mix) – 7:35
"Son of a Gun" (Alex Party Mix) – 4:51
"Son of a Gun" (C.Y.B. Run Mix) – 4:39
"Son of a Gun" (A Deeper Cut) – 7:29
"Son of a Gun" (Original Mix) – 5:50

 CD maxi, Europe
"Son of a Gun" (Original Hooj Edit) – 3:15
"Son of a Gun" (JX & Red Jerry Flog The Horse Remix) – 7:12
"Son of a Gun" (Blu Peter Vs Trigger Bitchin Remix) – 6:35
"Son of a Gun" (Candy Girls "Where's The Crack" Remix) – 9:07
"Son of a Gun" (Original Hooj 12" Mix) – 6:58

Charts

Weekly charts

Year-end charts

Release history

References

1994 songs
1994 debut singles
FFRR Records singles
Jake Williams songs
Music Week number-one dance singles
Songs written by Allan Felder
Songs written by Bunny Sigler
Songs written by Norman Harris (musician)